Sion Assidon (born in 1948) is a Moroccan human rights activist.

Biography 
Zion Assidon was born in 1948 to an Amazigh Jewish family in Safi. His family moved to Agadir shortly after, and then to Casablanca after then 1960 Agadir earthquake. He later moved to France, where he studied mathematics in Paris and became influenced by Marxist ideas. He decided to return to Morocco in 1967, after completing his studies.

In 1986, he founded an IT company before taking over the family business.

Activities 
During the Years of Lead, Assidon was involved in the fight for the establishment of democracy in his country, which led to his arrest in 1972. He spent 12 years in prison along with fellow opposition leaders and political dissidents.

Assidon is a “resolute defender of the Palestinian cause".

In 2005, he founded "Transparency Maroc" of which he became the director and he is a member of the Executive Board and the Board of Directors of Transparency International.

In 2011, he protested against Hindi Zahra with the Casablanca group of the Boycott, Divestment, Sanctions (BDS) because the singer had decided to hold a concert in Tel Aviv.

In April 2012, he protested the visit of Israeli tennis player Shahar Pe'er, declaring: "We should not receive artists or athletes from this country as if nothing had happened. It is abnormal to pretend everything is fine. These are people who are inflicting apartheid on the Palestinian people. We must not receive them but also show solidarity with the Palestinian people.”

Personal life 
Assidon is married to an American Palestinian. They have a son named Millal.

He is an atheist of Jewish descent but believes in freedom of religion.

See also 
Edmond Amran El Maleh
Abraham Serfaty
Léon Sultan
Reuven Abergel
Robert Assaraf

References

Moroccan human rights activists
Moroccan dissidents
1948 births
Living people
People from Safi, Morocco
Moroccan Jews
Anti-Zionist Jews
Moroccan communists
Jewish communists
Palestinian solidarity activists